Mary Low may refer to:
 Mary Caffrey Low, American librarian and educator
 Mary Fairchild MacMonnies Low, American painter